Enneapterygius vexillarius, the blacksaddle triplefin, is a species of triplefin blenny in the genus Enneapterygius. It was described by Henry Weed Fowler in 1946. Enneapterygius vexillarius has been recorded from the Ryukyu Islands, Taiwan and Hong Kong.

References

vexillarius
Fish described in 1946